Arne Dokken (born 27 August 1955) is a Norwegian former football player and coach. He played as forward for several Norwegian clubs and two Greek clubs and 24 matches for Norway national football team scoring two goals. In eight seasons in the Norwegian top division he played 147 matches scoring 64 goals. He was top scorer in 1. divisjon in 1975 and 1980. His son Kenneth Dokken also became a footballer.

Playing career

Club career
Arne Dokken was born in Drammen, started his career in Åssiden IF and went to Strømsgodset IF 19 years old. In the 1975 season he became top scorer in Norwegian top flight. He continued to Lillestrøm SK winning gold medals in the Norwegian Cup 1978 and the league 1981. He then became professional in Panathinaikos in Greece and on loan to Apollon Smyrnis also in Greece before he returned to Norway where he finished his career as player in Rosenborg BK.

International career
Dokken was capped once for Norway boys team, four times for the Norway u-19 and 11 times for Norway u-21. He was capped 24 times for the Norway national football team scoring two goals.

Managerial career
He started his career as coach in Rosenborg 1985 successfully as the team won gold medals. He was thereafter director of sports in Rosenborg BK and in FC Lyn Oslo. He continued to Strømsgodset IF as coach and head of sports and to Sandefjord Fotball where he was head coach in the 2004 season. He then became sports director in Hønefoss BK before he returned to Sandefjord Fotball as sports director.

Honours

As a player
Lillestrøm SK
 Norwegian top division: 1981; runner up: 1978
Norwegian Cup: 1978, 1981; runner up: 1980

Panathinaikos
 Alpha Ethniki; runner up: 1981–1982
 Greek Cup: 1982

As a manager
Rosenborg
 Norwegian top division: 1985

References

1955 births
Living people
Sportspeople from Drammen
Association football forwards
Norwegian footballers
Apollon Smyrnis F.C. players
Expatriate footballers in Greece
Lillestrøm SK players
Norway international footballers
Norwegian expatriate footballers
Norwegian expatriate sportspeople in Greece
Norwegian football managers
Eliteserien players
Panathinaikos F.C. players
Rosenborg BK managers
Sandefjord Fotball managers
Strømsgodset Toppfotball managers
Rosenborg BK players
Strømsgodset Toppfotball players